Russeks was a department store at 390 Fifth Avenue, at the intersection with West 36th Street in Midtown Manhattan, New York City.

The company was co-founded by brothers Frank Russek and Isidore H. Russek, and became Russeks Fifth Avenue, Inc.

Russeks started as a furrier in New York City during the early 1900s, and expanded into luxury clothing and accessories. In 1924, they opened a department store on 390 Fifth Avenue and West 36th Street. This was 390 Fifth Avenue, designed by Stanford White of McKim, Mead & White, and completed in 1904-1905 for the Gorham Manufacturing Company. 

In the 1940s (at least), they had a department store in Detroit.

In February 1959, they announced the closure of their Fifth Avenue store, after five years of losses, but would continue to operate in hotel and suburban locations. In 1960, the new owner, Spear Securities, remodelled the exterior of the lower floors.

References

Department stores of the United States
Fifth Avenue
Department store buildings
Companies based in New York City